Abacetus afer is a species of ground beetle in the subfamily Pterostichinae. It was described by Tschitscherine in 1899 and is found in Burkina Faso and Democratic Republic of the Congo, Africa.

References

afer
Beetles described in 1899
Insects of West Africa
Insects of Central Africa